Ghulam Kadir, fully Ghulam Abd al Qadir Ahmed Khan (unknown – 3March 1789), was a leader of the Afghan Rohilla during the late 18th century in the time of the Mughal Empire. He is particularly known for blinding the Mughal Emperor Shah Alam II and occupying and plundering Delhi for two and a half months in 1788.

Biography

Early life 

Ghulam Kadir was the son of Zabita Khan. His father had assumed the leadership of a branch of the Afghan Rohilla after the death of his own father Najib-ud-Daula on 31October 1770. As the eldest son of Najib-ud-Daula, Zabita Khan had succeeded him and was invested as Mir Bakhshi (Head of the Mughal Army) by Shah Alam II on 29December 1770.

Imprisonment in Qudsiya Bagh 
After several rebellions by the Rohillas led by Zabita Khan, Shah Alam II began a military campaign against him, led by the Maratha leader Mahadaji Shinde. During this campaign Ghulam Kadir, aged eight to ten, was captured in Ghausgarh (near Jalalabad in today's Shamli district, Uttar Pradesh) on 14September 1777 as part of Zabita Khan's family, while his father managed to escape.

After his capture, Ghulam Kadir was taken to Delhi. There he grew up in a "gilded cage" in the Qudsia Bagh: Shah Alam II called Ghulam Kadir his son (farzand) and granted him the title of Raushan-ud-Daula. The Mughal Emperor even wrote poems about him, some of which have been preserved. On the other hand it has been reported that Ghulam Kadir was castrated during his captivity. This, however, is disputed by modern scholarship, foremost by William Dalrymple.

As resentment against Ghulam Kadir grew in the palace, Shah Alam II sent him back to his father, Zabita Khan, who had regained the imperial favour once more and had again been established as Mir Bakhshi.

Campaign against Shah Alam II 
After the death of his father on 21January 1785, Ghulam Kadir was able to assert himself as his father's successor and leader of the Rohilla.

Appointment as Mir Bakhshi and regent in September 1787 
In 1787 Ghulam Kadir wished to step into his father's and grandfather's footsteps and become Mir Bakhshi of the Mughal Empire. To accomplish this feat, he demanded an audience with the emperor. At the Mughal court, the nazir  the superintendent of the Shah's harem , Manzur Ali Khan (also transliterated as "Munsoor Ali Khan"), supported Ghulam Kadir's cause against Maratha resistance. According to the historian Jadunath Sarkar, the nazir  who is said to have personally saved Ghulam Kadir's life in Ghausgarh in 1777  intended to use him to curb Hindu influence over the Mughal emperor.

As there were not enough men to defend Delhi, Ghulam Kadir entered the city on 26August 1787 and was presented to the emperor by the nazir. On 5September 1787 he entered the city again, this time ahead of 2,000 men. This action forced Shah Alam II to reluctantly establish him as Mir Bakhshi and regent of the Mughal empire and granting him the title amir al-umara.

Struggle with Begum Samru in October 1787 
To consolidate his position at Shah Alam II's court, Ghulam Kadir tried to secure the support of Begum Samru, the wife of Walter Reinhardt, and ruler over the principality of Sardhana, who had considerable influence at this time. Furthermore, she commanded four battalions of French-led sepoys stationed in the city and was thus in a position to disobey the Empire's new regent.

Ghulam Kadir's efforts to secure her support were, however, fruitless, as Begum rejected a proposal for an alliance. After this rejection, he demanded her removal from the city and declared that he would otherwise begin hostilities. As this demand was not met, he started cannonading Salimgarh Fort and on 7October 1787 the first cannonballs hit the imperial palace. Now the nazir intervened and was able to dissuade him from continuing his assault on the city.

Ghulam Kadir and his Rohillas then turned away from Delhi to conquer the crownlands in the Doab. This expansion led Lord Cornwallis to write a letter dated 14November 1787 to Ghulam Kadir asserting that the East India Company would not militarily engage him, as long as he observed peace with the Company and their ally, the Nawab of Awadh. This demand was accepted by Ghulam Kadir.

Occupation of Delhi in 1788 
In July 1788 Ghulam Kadir joined forces with Ismail Beg and their attention focused again on Delhi. The small imperial Mughal army was sent to engage them, but due to treason its leaders led their units away. On 18July 1788 Ghulam Kadir and Ismail Beg therefore took full possession of the city and of the Red Fort, after the nazir had tricked the Shah into granting them an audience and forbade any resistance by the Red Battalion on 15July 1788.

Ghulam Kadir's occupation of Delhi lasted from 18July 1788 to 2October 1788, marking Delhi's last Afghan occupation until today. During these months he deposed Shah Alam II on the 30July 1788 and installed the Mughal prince Bidar Bakht as the new emperor under the regnal name Nasir-ud-din Muhammad Jahan Shah. Bidar Bakht was the son of Ahmed Shah, who was a beloved step-son of Malika-uz-Zamani; Bidar Bakht's enthronement was the result of a pact between Ghulam Kadir and Malika-uz-Zamani, who paid 12lakhs of rupees to Ghulam Kadir to ensure her step-grandson's investiture. Badshah Begum wanted to see Shah Alam II deposed and laid low because Shah Alam's father, Alamgir II, had blinded and killed her beloved step-son, Ahmed Shah, in order to seize the throne.

The occupation led to a reign of terror, during which Shah Alam II was blinded on 10August 1788. According to tradition Ghulam Kadir said to the Shah immediately after his blinding that it was "the return for [his] action at Ghausgarh." In his quest to secure Mughal treasure, Ghulam Kadir tortured the Timurid imperial family and it is said that 21 princes and princesses were killed. The dishonouring behaviour towards the women of the imperial family is noted as especially cruel in the eyes of its time. Even Malika-uz-Zamani's fate turned as her palace was raided and she was placed on a river bank. The nazir's house was next to be sacked and stripped of all belongings. 

The plunder of Delhi resulted in losses amounting to 25crore of rupees. According to Jadunath Sarkar, this "dance of demons" finally "ruined the prestige of the empire beyond recovery".

Ismail Beg was not rewarded for his part in the occupation and left the Rohillas in September 1787, when the Marathas mounted an offensive to free Delhi from Ghulam Kadir's occupation. This force was led by Mahadaji Shinde and it managed to occupy Old Delhi on 28September 1787. Then an attack was conducted by the combined forces of the Marathas, of Begum Samru and of the turned Ismail Beg, which Ghulam Kadir's Rohillas could not withstand indefinitely. After the explosion of a powder magazine, that Ghulam Kadir saw as an omen, he abandoned Delhi Fort at 10October 1787 with his remaining troops. On 16October 1788 the now blind Shah Alam II was reinstated as Mughal emperor and on 17October 1788 khutbah was read in his name. His formal coronation happened on 7February 1789.

Escape and execution in 1789 
After the liberation of Delhi a hunt for Ghulam Kadir was mounted by the Marathas. Ghulam Kadir fled to Mirat fort, which in turn was encircled by the Marathas. After the conditions there had become intolerable, he managed to break the encirclement during the night with 500 horsemen and tried to escape to Ghausgarh. But during the engagement of his horsemen by a Maratha patrol, he lost sight of his entourage. Then his horse stumbled and broke his leg and he had to continue his escape alone and on foot. He reached Bamnauli (Uttar Pradesh), where he sought refuge in a house of a Brahman and offered him a reward for a horse and a guide, who could lead him to Ghausgarh. But the Brahman recognized him and alerted a party of Marathas, who captured him on 18December 1788 or 19December 1788. According to Jadunath Sarkar and Herbert Compton, the saddlebags of Ghulam Kadir stuffed with valuables looted from Delhi fell into the hands of Lestineau, who took them to the United Kingdom for his retirement.

Ghulam Kadir remained in Maratha custody for some time but was not harmed. However, on 28February 1789 Mahadaji Shinde received a letter by Shah Alam II, demanding the eyes of Ghulam Kadir as the Shah would otherwise retire to Mecca and live as a beggar. Then Mahadaji Shinde ordered his ears to be cut off, and the next days nose, tongue and upper lip were sent to the emperor in a casket. After this was done, his mutilation continued and his hands, feet and genitals were cut off, before he was hanged from a tree and beheaded at Mathura on 3March 1789. His ears and eyeballs were sent to the Shah.

In literature 
Muhammad Iqbal created a nazm about Ghulam Kadir in Urdu ("Ghulam Qadir Ruhela"), which narrates the treatment of the Timurids during the Delhi occupation in 1788.

References

Bibliography

External links 
 
 

1789 deaths
Date of birth unknown
Mughal Empire
Rohilla